Bjorn (English, Dutch), Björn (Swedish, Icelandic, Dutch, and German), Bjørn (Danish, Faroese and Norwegian), Beorn (Old English) or, rarely, Bjôrn, Biorn, or Latinized Biornus, Brum (Portuguese), is a Scandinavian male given name, or less often a surname. The name means "bear" (the animal). In Swedish, Finnish and Finland Swedish,the nickname Nalle ("teddy bear") refers to Björn.

Surname 
Claus Bjørn, Danish author, historian, and television and radio broadcaster
Evert Björn, Swedish Olympic athlete
Hugo Björne, Swedish actor
Kristian Bjørn, Norwegian skier
Lars "Lasse" Björn, Swedish Olympic ice hockey player
Thomas Bjørn, Danish golfer

Given name

Acting
Björn Andrésen, Swedish actor and musician
Björn Bjelfvenstam, Swedish actor
Björn Granath, Swedish actor
Björn Gustafsson, Swedish comedian and actor
Björn Kjellman, Swedish actor and singer
Björn Skifs, Swedish singer and actor

Art and music
Björn Afzelius, Swedish musician
Björn Ågren, guitarist for the band Razorlight
Björn Dixgård, Swedish musician
Bjørn Eidsvåg, Norwegian musician and Lutheran minister
Bjorn Englen, Swedish-American bass player of the hard rock band Soul Sign
Björn Gelotte, guitarist of the Swedish melodic death metal band In Flames
Björn Hjörtur Guðmundsson, Icelandic craftsman and environmental pioneer
Björn J:son Lindh, Swedish musician
Bjørn Johansen (musician), Norwegian jazz musician
Björn Lodin, Swedish musician
Bjørn Melhus, German artist
Bjørn Moe, Norwegian conductor
Bjørn Nilsen, Norwegian musician (performs as Lillebjørn Nilsen)
Björn "Speed" Strid, Swedish vocalist of modern melodic death metal band Soilwork
Bjørn Tagemose, Swedish director and videoartist
Bjørn Talén, Norwegian opera singer
Bjorn Thorsrud, American music producer
Bjørn Tidmand, Danish singer
Bjørn Torske, Norwegian music producer
Björn Ulvaeus, Swedish musician and a member of the pop group ABBA
Bjørn Wiinblad, Danish artist

Business
Bjørn Rune Gjelsten, Norwegian businessman and powerboat racer
Björn Jakobson, Swedish businessman, founder of Babybjörn and Artipelag
Björn Prytz, Swedish industrialist
Björn Stigson, Swedish business leader
Björn Wahlroos, Finnish CEO of Sampo Group
Bjørn Wegge, Norwegian director of information for the Norwegian Humanitarian Enterprise
Björn Westerlund (1912–2009), Finnish businessman and government minister, CEO of Nokia

Historical figures
Björn at Haugi, also called Björn på Håga and Bjorn Eriksson, Swedish king in the 9th century
Björn (III) Eriksson, king of Sweden in the 9th and 10th centuries
Beorn Estrithson (died 1049), English nobleman
Bjørn Farmann, king of Vestfold, petty kingdoms of Norway in the 10th century
Björn Ironside Haraldsson, the father of Christina Bjornsdatter, 12th-century Swedish queen
Björn Ironside, legendary Swedish king of the 9th century
Björn the Eunuch, legendary Swedish king of the 10th century
Björn Stallare, 11th-century Norwegian diplomat

Politics and government
Björn Bjarnason, Icelandic politician
Herman Bjorn Dahle, politician from Wisconsin, USA
Bjørn Egge. a major general of the Norwegian Defence Force
Björn Engholm, German politician
Björn Eriksson, Swedish civil servant
Björn von der Esch, Swedish politician
Bjørn Tore Godal, Norwegian politician
Björn Hamilton, Swedish politician
Björn Höcke, German politician 
Bjorn Holland, American politician
Bjørn Jacobsen, Norwegian politician
Björn Jónsson, former Prime Minister of Iceland
Ole Bjørn Kraft, Danish journalist and politician
Björn Leivik, Swedish politician
Björn Rosengren, Swedish politician
Bjørn Skau, Norwegian politician
Björn von Sydow, Swedish politician
Björn Þórðarson (Thordarson), former prime minister of Iceland
Bjørn Westh, Danish politician
Björn Wiechel (born 1983), Swedish politician
Bjørn Erling Ytterhorn, Norwegian politician

Science and technology
Björn Engquist, Swedish mathematician
Björn Envall, Swedish automotive designer
Björn Ekwall, Swedish toxicologist
Bjørn Grinde, Norwegian biologist
Björn Gunnlaugsson, Icelandic mathematician and cartographer
Biörn Ivemark, Swedish physician
Björn Kurtén, Finnish-Swedish paleontologist
Bjørn Lomborg, Danish environmental skeptic and author
Bjorn Poonen, American mathematician

Sports
Bjørn Bang Andersen, Norwegian shot putter
Björn Andersson, Swedish former player and coach
Björn Andersson (handballer), Swedish Olympic handballer
Björn Andrae, German volleyball player
Björn Bach, German kayaker
Bjorn Basson, South African rugby player
Björn Borg, Swedish tennis player
Björn Borg (swimmer), Swedish swimmer
Björn Bothén, Swedish sailor
Bjørn Otto Bragstad, Norwegian soccer player
Bjorn Bregy, Swiss kickboxer
Björn Cederberg, Swedish rally driver
Bjørn Dæhlie, Norwegian skier
Björn Daelemans, Belgian soccer player
Bjørn Dahl (footballer born 1954), Norwegian footballer
Bjørn Dahl (footballer born 1978), Norwegian footballer
Wouterus van der Doelen, known as Björn van der Doelen, Dutch soccer player
Björn Dunkerbeck, Dutch windsurfer
Björn Einarsson, Swedish bandy player
Björn Emmerling, German field hockey player
Björn Ferry, Swedish skier
Björn Forslund (sailor), Swedish sailor 
Björn Forslund (Speed skater), Swedish speed skater 
Bjorn Fratangelo, American tennis player 
Bjørn Grimnes, Norwegian athlete
Bjørn Gundersen, Norwegian athlete
Bjorn Haneveer, Belgian snooker player
Bjørn Johansen (footballer), Norwegian footballer
Bjørn Johansen (ice hockey), Norwegian ice hockey player
Björn Joppien, German badminton player
Björn Kircheisen, also known as Bjoern Kircheisen, German Olympic athlete
Björn Knutsson, Swedish motorcycle racer
Bjorn Kotze, Namibian cricketer
Bjørn "Benny" Kristensen, Danish soccer player
Björn Kuipers, Dutch football referee
Bjørn Tore Kvarme, Norwegian soccer player
Björn Leukemans, Belgian bicycle racer
Björn Lilius, Swedish footballer
Björn Lind, Swedish skier
Bjørn Arve Lund, Norwegian soccer player
Björn Maaseide, Norwegian beach volleyball player
Björn Melin, Swedish ice hockey player
Bjorn Merten, American football player
Bjorn Mordt, Zimbabwean cricketer
Bjørn Myrbakken, Norwegian ski jumper
Beorn Nijenhuis, Dutch speed skater
Björn Nittmo, Swedish American Football kicker
Björn Nordqvist, Swedish soccer player
Björn Otto, German pole vaulter
Bjørn Paulson, Norwegian high jumper
Björn Phau, German tennis player
Bjørn Helge Riise, Norwegian soccer player
Bjørn Einar Romøren, Norwegian ski jumper
Björn Runström, Swedish soccer player
Björn Schlicke, German soccer player
Björn Schröder, German cyclist
Björn Sengier, Belgian soccer player
Björn Siegemund, German badminton player
Bjørn Skaare, Norwegian ice hockey player
Bjørn Skjærpe, Norwegian gymnast
Bjørn Sundquist, German Olympic athlete
Björn Svensson, Swedish hockey player
Bjorn Thorfinnsson, Icelandic chess player
Björn Thurau, German cyclist
Bjørn Tronstad, Norwegian soccer player
Björn Waldegård, Swedish rally driver
Björn Wirdheim, Swedish racing driver
Bjørn Wirkola, Norwegian ski jumper
Björn Zikarsky, German swimmer

Writers
Bjørn Benkow, Norwegian journalist exposed as a plagiarist
Björn Th. Björnsson, Icelandic writer
Bjørn Hansen, Norwegian journalist
Björn Hellberg, Swedish sports journalist and author
Björn Kumm, Swedish journalist
Björn Nyberg, Swedish fantasy author
Björn Ranelid, Swedish author
Bjørn Erik Thon, Norwegian jurist and writer
Bjørnstjerne Bjørnson, Norwegian writer

Other people with the given name
 Bjørn Nyland (Automotive YouTuber), Thai-born Norwegian video blogger
 Claus Bjørn Larsen, Danish photographer

See also
Beorn, a character in The Hobbit
Bjarne
Björk (name)
Urs, name also meaning bear

References

Masculine given names
Scandinavian masculine given names
Norwegian masculine given names
Faroese masculine given names
Swedish masculine given names
Danish masculine given names
Icelandic masculine given names
Dutch masculine given names
German masculine given names
Surnames from nicknames